Jandy Nelson (born 1965) is an American author of young adult fiction. Prior to her career as an author, Nelson worked for 13 years as a literary agent at Manus & Associates Literary Agency. She holds a BA from Cornell University as well as several MFAs. She has one in poetry from Brown University and another in children's writing from Vermont College of Fine Arts. Nelson lives in San Francisco, California.

Works
Nelson's 2010 novel, The Sky Is Everywhere, follows seventeen-year-old Lennie Walker as she copes with her sister's death. Torn between loss and self-discovery, Lennie must learn to be the lead player in her own life. The Sky Is Everywhere was a Young Adult Library Services Association (YALSA) selection for Best Fiction for Young Adults; made numerous appearances on best-of-the-year lists, including those for National Public Radio (NPR), the Chicago Public Library and The Horn Book Magazine; and as of April 2015 had been published in over 20 countries.

Nelson's second novel, New York Times bestseller I'll Give You the Sun, was published in 2014; it is about close but highly competitive twins Noah and Jude. A series of family tragedies, cruelties and misunderstandings creates a rift between the two; only after they come back together do they begin to understand themselves and set their world right again. I'll Give You the Sun won the Printz Award, a Stonewall Honor, and Bank Street College of Education's Josette Frank Award. It was a 2014 California Book Awards Young Adult Finalist. It was listed on numerous best-of-the-year lists, including the 2015 YALSA Top 10 Best Fiction for Young Adults, NPR's Guide To 2014's Great Reads, Time magazine's Top 10 YA Books, and the American Library Association Rainbow List Top 10. As of April 2015, I'll Give You the Sun had been published in 25 countries and optioned by Warner Bros. for a film to be written by Natalie Krinsky and produced by Denise Di Novi and Allison Greenspan.

References

External links
 Official Website
 Pippin Properties
 I'll Give You the Sun on IMDB
 Interview with Jandy Nelson, The Guardian, 1 May 2015

American children's writers
Living people
1965 births
American women children's writers
Michael L. Printz Award winners
Women writers of young adult literature
Brown University alumni
21st-century American women